Opisthencentrus dentipennis is a species of beetles in the family Cicindelidae, the only species in the genus Opisthencentrus.

References

Cicindelidae
Monotypic Adephaga genera